The Woodbend Group is a stratigraphical unit of Frasnian age in the Western Canadian Sedimentary Basin. 

It was first described in the British American Pyrcz No. 1 well by Imperial Oil geological staff in 1950.

Lithology
The Formation is composed of crystalline and dolomitized limestone (Cooking Lake Formation) in off-reef areas, bituminous shale and argillaceous limestone, detrital limestone (reef fallout), stromatoporoid calcarenite (Duvernay Formation), gray shale, argillaceous limestone, argillaceous dolomite, crystalline dolomite (Ireton Formation). In reef build-ups, it consists of massive limestone and dolomite with porosity (Leduc Formation).

Hydrocarbon production

Oil is produced from the Leduc Formation in central Alberta since the early 1950s. Shale gas and liquids are extracted from the Duvernay Formation using horizontal drilling and multi-stage hydraulic fracturing. Several project test the economic viability of extracting bitumen from the Grosmont Formation.

Distribution
It extends laterally from north-eastern British Columbia through Alberta and into southern Saskatchewan and southern Manitoba. Reef build-ups range in size from small mounds to pinnacle reefs and large atoll size reefs and bank developments.

Subdivisions
Central Alberta
In central Alberta the following formations are recognized, from top to bottom:

Northeast Alberta
In northeast Alberta the following formations are recognized, from top to bottom:

Relationship to other units 

The Woodbend Group is conformably overlain by the Winterburn Group and conformably overlays the Beaverhill Lake Group. It is transgressive in the Peace River Arch and Tathlina uplift. Newer deposits rest on the Woodbend group upon an erosional surface in eastern Alberta, south-central Saskatchewan and Manitoba.

It is equivalent to the Birdbear Formation and Duperow Formation in northern Montana, southern Saskatchewan and southwestern Manitoba, as well as parts of the Fort Simpson Formation and Muskwa Formation of northeastern British Columbia and southern Yukon, while it corresponds to the Tathlina Formation, Twin Falls Formation and Hay River Formation in the Northwest Territories.

References 

Geologic groups of North America
Devonian Alberta
Devonian British Columbia
Devonian Saskatchewan
Devonian Manitoba
Devonian Northwest Territories
Western Canadian Sedimentary Basin
Devonian System of North America
Stratigraphy of Alberta
Stratigraphy of British Columbia
Stratigraphy of Saskatchewan
Stratigraphy of Manitoba
Stratigraphy of the Northwest Territories
Devonian southern paleotropical deposits
Frasnian Stage